Henry Moorehouse (or Moore) Black (January 15, 1827 – August 5, 1893) was a United States Army officer who served as Commandant of Cadets at the United States Military Academy.

Early career
Born in Delaware County, Pennsylvania in 1827, Henry Black was appointed to the United States Military Academy from Pennsylvania on July 1, 1842. He graduated and was appointed brevet Second Lieutenant in the 4th U.S. Infantry on July 1, 1847. He was commissioned a full Second Lieutenant in the 7th U.S. Infantry, August 20, 1847 and served with that regiment in the Mexican War at Mexico City.

From 1848 to 1855, Black served with the 7th Infantry at Jefferson Barracks, in Florida, and at Fort Gibson. He was promoted to First Lieutenant in the 9th U.S. Infantry on March 3, 1855, and served with them at Fort Monroe and on recruiting duty. He was then promoted to Captain in the 9th Infantry on September 10, 1856. From 1857 to 1861, he served with that regiment at Fort Simcoe and Fort Dalles, engaging in scouts against the Yakima and other Indians.

Civil War
During the American Civil War Black was on  the Pacific Coast from 1861 to 1864. In June 1861, he assumed command of the Army's Fort Vancouver, relieving future Union general John S. Mason. He was promoted to Colonel in the Sixth California Infantry on February 1, 1863. In February 1864, he was sent to Fort Humboldt with three companies of reinforcements ("C," "E" and "G"), to take command of the Humboldt Military District.

In June 1864 he was sent to West Point to be Commandant of Cadets of the United States Military Academy and an instructor of tactics. He was mustered out of the Sixth California Infantry October 27, 1865; was promoted to Major in the 7th U.S. Infantry on July 25, 1866; and promoted to Lieutenant-Colonel in the Fourth U.S. Infantry, on October 7, 1868.

Later career
Following his assignment at West Point Black was assigned to 15th U.S. Infantry, on July 1, 1870. From then until 1891, he was on duty with his regiment at posts in the South and West. He conducted courts martial, and commanded troops in Maryland and West Virginia during the railroad troubles in 1877. He made Colonel in the 23rd U.S. Infantry, on February 6, 1882.

He commanded Fort Wayne, Michigan until May, 1890. He then commanded Fort Sam Houston until January 15, 1891, when he retired from active service, at 64 years of age. Black died of heart failure on August 5, 1893 at the home of his son-in-law George M. Randall in Chicago, Illinois, aged 66. He was interred at the West Point Cemetery on August 8, 1893.

Notes

References

1827 births
1893 deaths
People from Delaware County, Pennsylvania
United States Military Academy alumni
United States Army officers
Military personnel from Pennsylvania
American military personnel of the Mexican–American War
People of Pennsylvania in the American Civil War
Commandants of the Corps of Cadets of the United States Military Academy
United States Military Academy faculty
Union Army colonels
Bald Hills War
Burials at West Point Cemetery